The seventh season of Shameless, based on the British series of the same name by Paul Abbott, is an American comedy-drama television series with executive producers John Wells, Christopher Chulack, Krista Vernoff, Etan Frankel, Nancy M. Pimental and Sheila Callaghan. The season premiered on October 2, 2016, the first time the series has debuted in autumn. Showtime premiered a free preview of the season premiere online on September 23, 2016, ahead of the October 2 broadcast.

Plot
One month after Fiona's failed wedding, Frank wakes up in a coma and is disowned by his family. Fiona is finally trying to take control of her life, having become the manager of Patsy's Pies. She revamps the diner in order to increase its audience. When a local laundromat building goes up for sale, Fiona buys the laundromat after speaking with the senile owner, Etta, who has Alzheimer's. With the help of Frank and Kevin, Fiona revamps the laundromat and, forgiving her father, lets Frank stay with Etta in her apartment. Though business at the revamped laundromat initially goes well, Fiona sells the building for a major profit and subsequently sends Etta to live at a nursing home.

Lip, still struggling with alcoholism, begins a relationship with Sierra, a single mother whom Fiona hires as a waitress at Patsy's. Raising her young son alone, Sierra has left her ex-boyfriend, Charlie, due to his drug addiction. Debbie, wanting to provide Franny with a home life, gets engaged to Sierra's handicapped brother Neil, though both Sierra and Lip are disapproving of the relationship. Following his college expulsion, Lip attends an appeal at his college that Professor Youens had orchestrated. However, the committee refuses to expunge Lip's disciplinary record and refuses to let him re-enroll. This culminates in Lip relapsing back to alcohol, and when he drunkenly attacks Charlie, Sierra breaks up with him, not wanting her son to deal with two addicts. Meanwhile, Kevin and Veronica are forced to find new jobs after Svetlana manipulates them into giving her full ownership of the Alibi. Feeling betrayed, Kevin and Veronica cut off their romantic relationship with Svetlana. Carl receives a scholarship for military school and decides to attend; the school changes his personality for the better.

When Frank briefly begins a short-lived homeless shelter in the neighborhood, Ian meets Trevor, a male transgender activist wanting to volunteer at the shelter. Ian and Trevor begin dating, but their relationship is tested when Ian is informed by an officer that Mickey has recently broken out of prison. Unbeknownst to Trevor, Ian reconnects with Mickey, who is on the run with another inmate; Mickey implores Ian to flee with him across the Mexican border, which forces Ian to make a hard decision. Though he initially accompanies Mickey to the border, he experiences second thoughts before crossing and refuses to go through with Mickey's plan. Heartbroken, Mickey shares a final kiss with Ian before successfully crossing the border wearing a disguise. Ian later apologizes to Trevor for cheating on him.

The second half of the season revolves around the reappearance of a frail Monica, who has returned to make amends with her family—however, her kids are all generally dismissive of her. Monica reconciles with Frank and reveals that she is dying with irreparable brain damage; the two resort back to their old habits. Frank and Monica eventually decide to renew their vows, and the following morning, Monica passes away in her sleep from a brain aneurysm. Indifferent to her mother's death, Fiona meets with her grandfather to prepare a small funeral, while Frank gives each family member a portion of Monica's inheritance: 70 pounds of crystal meth. Fiona buries her portion of the meth in Monica's coffin. The Gallagher family and friends host a small party following Monica's funeral: Frank is accepted by his family once again, and he shares a dance with Fiona; Lip and Sierra have a good time at the party—they remain separated, but stay on good terms.

The seventh season closes with a montage of the Gallaghers continuing on with their lives, some with new beginnings: Debbie has begun taking welding classes; Lip gets a new AA sponsor, Brad; Carl has returned from military school as a changed man; Fiona becomes the owner of a local apartment building.

Cast

Main
William H. Macy as Frank Gallagher
Emmy Rossum as Fiona Gallagher
Jeremy Allen White as Philip "Lip" Gallagher
Ethan Cutkosky as Carl Gallagher 
Shanola Hampton as Veronica “V” Fisher
Steve Howey as Kevin "Kev" Ball
Emma Kenney as Debbie Gallagher
Cameron Monaghan as Ian Gallagher
Isidora Goreshter as Svetlana Yevgenivna Fisher

Special guest stars
Noel Fisher as Mickey Milkovich
Chloe Webb as Monica Gallagher
Sasha Alexander as Helene Runyon
June Squibb as Etta

Recurring
Brendan and Brandon Sims as Liam Gallagher
 Alan Rosenberg as Professor Youens
 Jeff Pierre as Caleb
 Jaylen Barron as Dominique Winslow
 Rebecca Metz as Melinda
 Jim Hoffmaster as Kermit
 Michael Patrick McGill as Tommy
Tate Ellington as Chad
 Abena Ansah as Jolayemi
John Hennigan as Cody
Peter Macon as Sergeant Winslow
Pasha Lychnikoff as Yvon
Sharon Lawrence as Margo Mierzejewski
Alicia Coppola as Sue
Arden Myrin as New Monica/Delores
Ruby Modine as Sierra
Zack Pearlman as Neil
Elliot Fletcher as Trevor
 José Julián as Joaquin
 Chet Hanks as Charlie
 Barry Sloane as Ryan
 Scott Michael Campbell as Brad

Episodes

Production
Recurring actress Isidora Goreshter has been promoted to series regular with the commencement of the season. Star Emmy Rossum made her directorial debut with the fourth episode, "I Am A Storm".

References

External links

Shameless (American TV series)
2016 American television seasons